Italy competed at the 2014 Winter Paralympics in Sochi, Russia, held between 7–16 March 2014.

Alpine skiing

Men

Women

Snowboarding

Para-snowboarding is making its debut at the Winter Paralympics and it will be placed under the Alpine skiing program during the 2014 Games.

Men

 Women

Biathlon 

Men

Women

Cross-country skiing

Men

Women

Ice sledge hockey

Team
Gabriele Araudo
Bruno Balossetti
Gianluca Cavaliere
Andrea Chiarotti
Giuseppe Candello
Valerio Corvino
Christoph Depaoli
Rupert Kanestrin
Nils Larch
Gregory Brian Alexis Leperdi
Andrea Macri
Florian Planker
Roberto Radice
Gianluigi Rosa
Igor Stella
Santino Stillitano
Werner Winkler

Preliminaries

5–8 Classification Play-offs

5th Place Game

See also
Italy at the Paralympics
Italy at the 2014 Winter Olympics

References

Nations at the 2014 Winter Paralympics
2014
Winter Paralympics